The Diocese of St Davids is a diocese of the Church in Wales, a church of the Anglican Communion. The diocese covers the historic extent of Ceredigion, Carmarthenshire and Pembrokeshire, together with a small part of western Glamorgan. The episcopal see is the Cathedral Church of St David in the City of St Davids, Pembrokeshire. The present cathedral, which was begun in 1181, stands on the site of a monastery founded in the 6th century by Saint David.

The diocese is divided into the three archdeaconries of St Davids, Carmarthen and Cardigan (additionally, Mones Farah was collated on 12 August 2018 as Archdeacon for New Church Communities). The bishop's residence is Llys Esgob in Abergwili, Carmarthenshire.

History 

The history of the diocese of St Davids is traditionally traced to that saint in the latter half of the 6th century. Records of the history of the diocese before Norman times are very fragmentary, however, consisting of a few chance references in old chronicles, such as Annales Cambriae and Brut y Tywysogion (Rolls Series).

Until 1852 the diocese also included some parishes in Herefordshire.

The diocese assumed its current extent in 1923, when the Diocese of Swansea and Brecon was created from the eastern part of the diocese.

The office of Bishop of St David's has existed since the founding of the cathedral. The current bishop, the 129th, is Joanna Penberthy, whose election was confirmed on 30 November 2016, whose consecration was scheduled for 21 January 2017 at Llandaff Cathedral and her enthronement at St Davids Cathedral was scheduled for 11 February 2017. She became the first woman ordained a bishop in the Church in Wales upon her consecration.

In 2019 the diocese began to reorganise its churches into 23 Ministry Areas, plus the Cathedral. This process was completed in 2021 and the ministry areas are now coterminous with the deaneries.

Archdeaconries and deaneries

List of churches: Archdeaconry of Cardigan

Deanery of Aberystwyth

Deanery of Bro Aeron Mydr

Closed churches

Deanery of Bro Padarn

Closed churches

Deanery of Bro Teifi

Closed churches in this area

Deanery of Bro Wyre

Closed churches in this area

Deanery of Emlyn

Closed churches in this area

Deanery of Glyn Aeron Coastal

Closed churches in this area

Deanery of Lampeter

Closed churches in this area

Archdeaconry of Carmarthen

Deanery of Bro Aman

Closed churches in the area

Deanery of Bro Caerfyrddin

Deanery of Bro Cydweli

Deanery of Bro Dinefwr

Deanery of Bro Dyfri

Deanery of Bro Gwendraeth

Deanery of Bro Lliedi

Deanery of Bro Sancler

Deanery of Carmarthen

Deanery of Llandeilo

Archdeaconry of St Davids

Deanery of Daugleddau

Closed churches in the area

Deanery of East Landsker

Deanery of Greater Dewisland

Closed churches in the area

Deanery of Narberth and Tenby

Closed churches in this area

Deanery of Roose

Deanery of South West Pembrokeshire

Closed churches

Deanery of The Cathedral

Deanery of West Cemaes

See also 
 Bishop of St Davids

References 

Saint Davids